The Constitution of Russia was enacted in 1993.

Russian constitution and Constitution of Russia may also refer to:

 Russian Constitution of 1906
 Soviet Russia Constitution of 1918
 1925 Russian Constitution adopted because of the 1924 Soviet Constitution
 1937 Russian Constitution adopted because of the 1936 Soviet Constitution
 Russian Constitution of 1978 adopted because of the 1977 Soviet Constitution

See also 
 Constitution of the Soviet Union